Jean Charles Davillier (17 March 1823 – 1 March 1883) was a French writer and art collector.

Grandson of the banker Jean Charles Joachim Davillier, his inheritance was donated to the Louvre, Bibliothèque nationale de France and the Manufacture nationale de Sèvres.

References

1823 births
1883 deaths
French art collectors
French bibliophiles
Bullfighting in France
19th-century French writers